Trianglen station is an underground Copenhagen Metro station located at Trianglen (literally "The Triangle"), at the corner of Blegdamsvej and Øster Allé, in the Østerbro district of Copenhagen, Denmark. The station is on the City Circle Line  (M3), between Østerport and Poul Henningsens Plads, and is in Zone 1.

History
The station is underground. It was opened on 29 September 2019 together with 16 other stations of the line.

Service

References

Railway stations opened in 2019
2019 establishments in Denmark
City Circle Line (Copenhagen Metro) stations
Railway stations in Denmark opened in the 21st century